Wrong Number, Miss is a 1932 German romantic comedy film directed by E. W. Emo and starring Magda Schneider, Johannes Riemann, and Trude Berliner. The film was shot at the Staaken Studios in Berlin with sets were designed by the art directors Robert Neppach and Erwin Scharf. It was remade in Italian the same year as The Telephone Operator. In 1934 it was remade as a British film Give Her a Ring.

Synopsis
Charmed by one of the callers she speaks to, a telephone operator arranges a rendezvous with him. Unfortunately it is at the same place where her boss is also having a secret assignation.

Cast

References

Bibliography 
 
 Klaus, Ulrich J. Deutsche Tonfilme: Jahrgang 1932. Klaus-Archiv, 1988.

External links 
 

1932 films
1932 romantic comedy films
Films of the Weimar Republic
German romantic comedy films
1930s German-language films
Films directed by E. W. Emo
German black-and-white films
Films about telephony
1930s German films
Films shot at Staaken Studios